Proskuryakov or alternative spelling Proskouriakov and Proskouriakoff is a surname. It may refer to:

Ilya Proskuryakov (born 1987), is a Russian ice hockey player and  goaltender
Viktor Proskuryakov, a trainee present to watch Toptunov during the disaster. See Individual involvement in the Chernobyl disaster#Aleksandr Kudryavtsev and Viktor Proskuryakov
Lavr Proskouriakov (1858–1926), an authority on bridge engineering and structural mechanics in the Russian empire and the early Soviet Union
Tatiana Proskouriakoff (1909–1985), Russian-American Mayanist scholar and archaeologist who contributed significantly to the deciphering of Maya hieroglyphs, the writing system of the pre-Columbian Maya civilization of Mesoamerica